Hamlin Reservation is a nature reserve located in Ipswich, Massachusetts.  The reserve was established by The Trustees of Reservations in 1993.

References

External links 
 The Trustees of Reservations: Hamlin Reservation
 Trail map

The Trustees of Reservations
Open space reserves of Massachusetts
Protected areas of Essex County, Massachusetts
Ipswich, Massachusetts